Ignaz Czapka was a mayor of Vienna.

References 

Mayors of Vienna
Austrian people of Czech descent
1791 births
1881 deaths